Herman Nils Johansson (born 16 October 1997), is a Swedish footballer who plays for Mjällby AIF as a midfielder.

Club career
In December 2020, Johansson was recruited by Mjällby AIF, where he signed a three-year contract.

References

External links

1997 births
Living people
Swedish footballers
Association football midfielders
Mjällby AIF players
Allsvenskan players
People from Örnsköldsvik Municipality
Sportspeople from Västernorrland County